Giuseppe Cesari  (14 February 1568 – 3 July 1640) was an Italian Mannerist painter, also named Il Giuseppino and called Cavaliere d'Arpino, because he was created Cavaliere di Cristo by his patron Pope Clement VIII. He was much patronized in Rome by both Clement and Sixtus V.  He was the chief of the studio in which Caravaggio trained upon the younger painter's arrival in Rome.

Biography

Cesari's father, Muzio Cesari, had been a native of Arpino, but Giuseppe himself was born in Rome.  Here, he was apprenticed to Niccolò Pomarancio. Cesari is stigmatized by Luigi Lanzi, as not less the corrupter of taste in painting than Marino was in poetry. (Lanzi disdained the style of post-Michelangelo Mannerism as a time of decline.)

Cesari's first major work, done in his twenties, was the painting of the right counterfacade of San Lorenzo in Damaso, completed from 1588 to 1589. On 28 June 1589, he received the commission for the murals of the choir vault in the Certosa di San Martino in Naples. From 1591 he was again in Rome, where he painted the vault in the Contarelli Chapel within the church of San Luigi dei Francesi. He also completed murals in the Cappella Olgiati in Santa Prassede, and the vault of the Sacristy in the Certosa di San Martino.

He was a man of touchy and irascible character, and rose from penury to the height of opulence. His brother Bernardino Cesari assisted in many of his works.
Cesari became a member of the Accademia di San Luca in 1585. In 1607, he was briefly jailed by the new papal administration. He died in 1640, at the age of seventy-two, or perhaps of eighty, at Rome.

His only direct followers were his sons Muzio (1619–1676) and Bernardino (d. 1703). Pier Francesco Mola (1612–1666) apprenticed in his studio. Other pupils include Francesco Allegrini da Gubbio, Guido Ubaldo Abatini, Vincenzo Manenti, and Bernardino Parasole.

His most notable and perhaps surprising pupil was Caravaggio. In c. 1593–94, Caravaggio held a job at Cesari's studio as a painter of flowers and fruit.

Selected works
Cappella Olgiati in Santa Prassede (1592)
Frescoes in Salon of the Palazzo dei Conservatori (now Capitoline Museum, 1595-56)
Battle between Horatii and Curiatii
Finding of the She-wolf
Rape of the Sabine Women
Numa Pompilius Instituting the Cult of the Vestals
Cappella Paolina in the church of Santa Maria Maggiore (1609)
immaculate Conception, Real Academia de Bellas Artes de San Fernando, Madrid.
Prado Museum, Madrid
The Holy Family with the Infant Saint John
The Mystical Betrothal of Saint Catherine

References

Bibliography
Gash, J. (1996). Caravaggio, in Turner, J. (ed). The Dictionary of Art. London: Macmillan

External links
Biography at arte-argomenti.org 

Orazio and Artemisia Gentileschi, a fully digitized exhibition catalog from The Metropolitan Museum of Art Libraries, which contains material on Giuseppe Cesari (see index)

1560s births
1640 deaths
Painters from Rome
16th-century Italian painters
Italian male painters
17th-century Italian painters
Italian Mannerist painters
Catholic painters